Shkodrov may refer to:

 4364 Shkodrov
 Vladimir Shkodrov